Anti-Khmer sentiment, Khmerophobia or sometimes refers as anti-Cambodian sentiment, is a sentiment against Cambodia, the Khmers, overseas Khmer, or Khmer culture. As the Khmers are dominant in Cambodia, it can be attributed to anti-Cambodian sentiment and hatreds against Cambodians.

Notable anti-Khmer sentiment

Vietnam
During the time of Minh Mạng of the Nguyễn dynasty, Vietnam implied a policy as "Hán di hữu ngạn" 漢夷有限 ("the Vietnamese and the barbarians must have clear borders") when differentiating between Khmers and the Vietnamese. Emperor Minh Mạng, the son of Gia Long stated with regards to the Vietnamese forcing the ethnic minorities to follow Sino-Vietnamese customs that "We must hope that their barbarian habits will be subconsciously dissipated, and that they will daily become more infected by Han [Sino-Vietnamese] customs."

There were numerous Vietnamese invasions and occupation of Cambodia, although it was rather short-lived.

After the Vietnamese invasion of Cambodia later, at 1979, overthrew the Khmer Rouge, Vietnamese troops stationed to Cambodia until 1989 to stabilize and partially occupy the country, helping Cambodians 'recover' from war, as well as controlling the Cambodian ruling elites.

Currently, with the recent anti-Vietnamese and pro-Chinese movement in Cambodia launched by Sam Rainsy and Cambodia's support for China in the South China Sea's conflict, Vietnamese have become more hostile towards Cambodia and Cambodian people.

Thailand
Hatreds against Khmers began with the rise of Ayutthaya Kingdom. The Siamese had ransacked Angkor Wat and invaded Cambodia many times in the history. Notably, Siamese Prince and King Naresuan had launched an invasion which ransacked entire of Cambodia and Khmers being forced to Siam as its slave labors. It became a cure which would be remembered as Siamese atrocities against Khmers.

In the later times, when Vietnam rose to become a fierce rival, Siam had fought against Vietnam. However, many of Siam's attempt mostly crossed through Cambodia, which they had raped, looted and enslaved many Khmers during its road of invading Vietnam, thus led to many hostilities and hatreds against Cambodians among Siamese.

Since then, a numerous of disputes continued. In January 2003, riots broke out in Phnom Penh after a Cambodian newspaper incorrectly reported that a Thai actress had stated Angkor Wat properly belonged to Thailand. On 29 January, the Thai embassy was burned, and hundreds of Thai immigrants fled the country to avoid the violence. Cambodians in Phnom Penh burned photos of King Bhumibol Adulyadej and Thais in Bangkok protested in front of the Cambodian embassy, burning Cambodian flags. This eventually led to the Thai government to sever diplomatic ties with Cambodia. Prime Minister Hun Sen banned Thai shows and films on TV stations. Throughout 2008–13, Thai and Cambodian military forces did skirmish on each other over the Preah Vihear, leading to the Cambodian–Thai border dispute. The International Court of Justice's decision in the dispute favored Cambodia, which sparked anger among Thai citizens.

China
Throughout many dynasties of China, Chinese envoys and travellers that journeyed to Cambodia have always viewed and seen the Khmers as outside barbarians not in their sinosphere circle, most notably Zhou Daguan and his recount of his stay in Cambodia in the years 1296–1297, he expressively looks down on Cambodia in which he calls the Khmers as "uncivilized barbarians" who were mostly bareskinned and did not wear much clothing to cover themselves up and ate by their hands.

Japan
In 1993, Atsuhito Nakata, a UN peacekeeping official, came to Cambodia to manage peace talks with the Khmer Rogue and Vietnam. However, he was murdered by a Khmer nationalist. Nationwide protests by Japanese people in Japan called for boycotting the peace talks and to abandon the peace effort in Cambodia. Haruyuki Takata, a 33-year-old Japanese policeman, was killed by a Khmer nationalist while on patrol last week near the Thai-Cambodian border. His death, dominated headlines in Japan for a week and plunged Japan into a domestic crisis, with politicians and influential newspapers calling for withdrawal of Japanese forces from Cambodia.

Laos
Laos has border disputes and conflicts with Cambodia, with times even becoming tense and anti-Khmer sentiment rising. When the French assisted Cambodia after Khmer diplomats begged for the French to help them give them back their "lost, stolen" lands of the Khmer Empire 1000 years ago, they reluctantly ceded southern Laotian lands to Cambodia.

Singapore
Singapore, as one of the cofounders of ASEAN, Bilahari Kausikan, a former permanent secretary of Singapore's Foreign Affairs, suggested to kick Cambodia out of ASEAN due to Cambodia relying on and favoring towards China, essentially becoming their proxy and seeing it as traitorous to the cause of ASEAN.

United States

Cambodians in the United States have been subject to racial discrimination. Besides general anti-Asian racism, Cambodians were sometimes seen as being related to the Vietnamese opponent from the Vietnam War.

See also
Anti-Vietnamese sentiment
Anti-Thai sentiment
Anti-Malay sentiment
Anti-Filipino sentiment
Sinophobia

References

Khmer
Racism
Khmer
Articles containing video clips
Khmer people